Lucienne Stassaert (born 10 January 1936) is a Belgian poet.

Bibliography
 Verhalen van de jonkvrouw met de spade (1965)
 Bongobloesembloed (with Max Kazan) (1966)
 Fossiel (1969)
 Het dagelijks feest (1970)
 De houtworm (1970)
 Het Stenenrijk (1973)
 In de klok van de machine tikt een mens (1973)
 De blauwe uniformen (1974)
 Vergeten grens (1974)
 Een kleine zeeanemoon (1975)
 Best mogelijk (1975)

Awards
 1975 – Visser-Neerlandiaprijs
 1980 – Arkprijs van het Vrije Woord
 1994 – Provinciale Prijs voor Letterkunde van de stad Antwerpen

See also

 Flemish literature

References

Sources

 Michiel van Kempen, 'Bespreking van De lichtvoetige amazone: Het geheime leven van Aphra Behn''' in: Oso, Tijdschrift voor Surinaamse taalkunde, letterkunde en geschiedenis'', 21 (2002), nr. 1, mei, pp. 162–163.

1936 births
Flemish poets
Belgian women poets
Living people
Ark Prize of the Free Word winners
Flemish women writers